These are the results of the men's C-2 1000 metres competition in canoeing at the 1936 Summer Olympics.  The C-2 event is raced by two-man sprint canoes and was held on Saturday, August 8, 1936.

Ten canoeists from five nations competed.

Medalists

Final
With only five teams competing, a final was held.

Notes

References
1936 Summer Olympics Official Report Volume 2. p. 1024.
International Canoe Federation 1936 C-2 1000 m results.
Sports reference.com 1936 C-2 1000 m results
Sport123.com C-2 1000 m Olympic medalists: 1936-2008. 
Heijmans, Jeroen. "Re:Dispute issue with 1936 C-2 1000 m silver medalists from Austria" E-mail to Sean Forman, Simon Toulson, Chris Miller, and David Wallechinsky. 8 September 2008.
Wallechinsky, David and Jamie Loucky. (2008) "Canoeing: Men's Canadian Pars 1000 Meters". In The Complete Book of the Olympics: 2008 Edition. London: Aurum Press Limited. p. 482.

Men's C-2 1000